Love U...Mr. Kalakaar! is a 2011 Bollywood film. The film is directed by debutant S. Manasvi, who is an alumnus of the Film and Television Institute of India. It is the first film in which Tusshar Kapoor and Amrita Rao appear together. It was released on 13 May 2011.

Plot
Sahil (Tusshar Kapoor), is an artist who draws cartoons. He falls in love with Ritu (Amrita Rao), the daughter of a businessman (Ram Kapoor), for whom Sahil had designed a mascot. The story moves on and both fall in love. Her father hates artists, and he decides she will not marry him. Upon her compulsion, her father decided to hire Sahil as the managing director of his company for three months. He has to earn profits in those three months to marry his daughter. Company politics come into play and Sahil falls short of his goals. But eventually, his dream of becoming a cartoon strip writer is realized when a newspaper decides to publish his cartoon "Office Space."

Cast

 Tusshar Kapoor as Sahil 
 Amrita Rao as Ritu
 Ram Kapoor as Deshraj Diwan, Ritu's father
 Madhoo as Vidya, Ritu's Aunt
 Prem Chopra as Ritu's Grandfather
 Jai Kalra as Manohar
 Kiran Kumar as Jayant Singh Chauhan
 Snigdha Akolkar as Charu
 Prashant Ranyal as Aman
 Yatin Karyekar as Israni
 Kunal Kumar as Hiten
 Sooraj Barjatya as Peon
 Prarthana Behere as Kamya

Soundtrack

Reception

Love U...Mr. Kalakaar! received mixed reviews from Indian critics. Nikhat Kazmi of the Times of India gave it 2.5 out of five stars and wrote in her review, "The film does have a sweetness that grows on you and seasoned actors like Ram Kapoor and Madhoo add a dignity to their roles. The love birds Tusshar and Amrita are in sync with each other, but the film is so predictable and so long, it loses impact. Surely, a bit of reinvention is the need of the hour for Rajshri Inc too. After all, it's a fast and furious world we live in today.". Bollywood portal FilmiTadka rated it 3 out of 5 stars and said, "The story is weak at the beginning but picks up pace in the second half, overall it’s a decent first attempt by the director." Preeti Arora of Rediff found the movie unimpressive and wrote, "The Rajshri fans who thrive on old world love stories might just enjoy this. Simple and uncomplicated crafted in true Barjatya fashion. Or if you like the idea of Tusshar Kapoor in a lead romantic role. There aren't too many of these films being made these days. Thankfully!" Subhash K Jha wrote, "It is Harindranath Chattopadhyay who said, 'It's very difficult to be simple'. It takes a lot of guts to make a film as simple, honest and transparent as Love U...Mr Kalaakar in this day and age when Munni and Sheila are happily letting it all hang out and Ragini's love is lost in the lust and greed of an MMS mess."

Controversies

Mongoose hair paintbrushes used in this film by the artist is a crime against the Wild Life Protection Act, 1972.

References

External links 

 
 
 Love U...Mr. Kalakaar! at Bollywood Hungama

2011 films
2010s Hindi-language films
Films shot in India
Rajshri Productions films